Mildred's Big City Food is a restaurant in Micanopy, Florida, within the greater Gainesville area.

History
Opened around 1994 as Mildred's Cottage Gourmet in Micanopy, owners Russell and Nancy Baum relocated the restaurant to Gainesville in 1998. The restaurant is named after the character played by Joan Crawford in Mildred Pierce.

In 2020, during the COVID-19 pandemic, the owners of the restaurant worked with local advocacy groups to donate food and deliver meals. Later that year, they distributed over 700 free Thanksgiving meals to local families in need.

Menu
Their dishes often include regional specialties such as tripletail. Sides include North Florida okra, chestnut, turnip, melon and persimmon. Wine dinners have been offered.

References

External links
Mildred's Big City Food website

Buildings and structures in Gainesville, Florida
Restaurants established in 1994
1994 establishments in Florida